

Works published

Denmark
 Thomas Kingo, Aandelige Siunge-Koor ("Spiritual Choirs"), hymns, some of which are still sung

Other
 Alaol, Padmavati, Bangladesh
 Martin Opitz, Das Buch der Deutschen Poeterey ("A Book of German Poetics"), Germany

Births and deaths

Danish poets

 Anders Arrebo (1587–1637)
 Anders Bording (1619–1677)
 Thomas Kingo (1634–1703)
 Ludvig Holberg (1684–1754), Danish/Norwegian poet and playwright

German poets
 Barthold Heinrich Brockes (1680–1747)
 Paul Gerhart (1607–1676)
 Andreas Gryphius (1616–1664)
 Joachim Neander (1650–1680)
 Martin Opitz (1597–1639)

Norwegian poets
 Petter Dass (1647–1707)
 Dorothe Engelbretsdatter (1643–1716)
 Ludvig Holberg (1684–1754), Danish/Norwegian poet and playwright

Swedish poets
 Georg Stiernhielm (1598–1672)
 Samuel Columbus (1642–1679)
 Urban Hiarne (1641–1724)
 Lars Wivallius (1605–1669)
 Lars Johansson (1638–1674)
 Gunno Eurelius Dahlstierna (1661–1709)
 Samuel Triewald (1688–1743)
 Jacob Frese (1691–1729)
 Johan Runius (1679–1713)

Italian, Latin-language poets
 Gerolamo Aleandro (1574–1629), Italian, Latin-language poet

Japanese poets

Kada no Azumamaro 荷田春満 (1669–1736), early Edo period poet,  philologist and teacher as well as poetry tutor to one of the sons of Emperor Reigen; together with Keichū, co-founder of the kokugaku ("national studies") intellectual movement
Kamo no Mabuchi 賀茂真淵 (1697–1769), Edo period poet and philologist
Matsuo Bashō 松尾 芭蕉 (1644–1694), the most famous Edo period poet, recognized for his works in the collaborative haikai no renga form; now more recognized as a master of haiku
Naito Joso (1662–1704), Genroku period haiku poet, a principal disciple of Bashō
 Nishiyama Sōin 西山宗因, born Nishiyama Toyoichi 西山豊一 (1605–1682), early Tokugawa period haikai-no-renga (comical renga) poet who founded the Danrin ("talkative forest") school of haikai poetry
Nozawa Bonchō 野沢 凡兆 (c. 1640 – 1714), haikai poet
 Sonome 斯波 園女 (1664–1726), woman poet, friend and noted correspondent of Matsuo Bashō
Takarai Kikaku 宝井其角, also known as "Enomoto Kikaku" (1661–1707), haiku poet and disciple of Matsuo Bashō

Persian-language poets
 Abul Ma'āni Abdul Qader Bedil also known as "Abdol-Qader Bidel Dehlavi" (1642–1720)
 Zeb-un-Nissa Makhfi (1637–1702)
 Sheikh Bahaii, Scientist, architect, philosopher, and poet (1546-1620)

South Asia
 Akho (1591–1659), poet, Vedantist and radical
 Rupa Bhavani (1621–1721), Indian, Kashmiri-language poet
 Arnos Paathiri, also known as "Johann Ernst Hanxleden" (1681–1732), a German Jesuit priest, missionary in India and a Malayalam/Sanskrit poet, grammarian, lexicographer, and philologist
 Premanand (poet) (1640–1700) nonreligious Indian poet who wrote originally in Hindi, but when reprimanded by his guru, switched to Gujarati, which he vowed to develop into a language of fine literary expression
 Wali Muhammad Wali, Wali Deccani (1667–1707), Urdu-language poet
 Mirza Mazhar Jan-e-Janaan (1699–1781), Urdu-language poet

See also

 17th century in literature
 Cavalier poets in England, who supported the monarch against the puritans in the English Civil War (1641–1651)
 Elizabethan literature (1557–1603)
 Poetry
 Restoration literature (1660–1689)

Decades and years

Notes

 
Poetry by century